SS Phryné was a French cargo ship that hit a mine laid by U-13 in the North Sea 3.5 nautical miles (6.5 km) off the Aldeburgh Lightship, while she was travelling from Immingham, United Kingdom to Bayonne, France.

Construction 
Phryné was constructed in 1938 at the Société des Chantiers de Normandie - Laporte & Cie. shipyard in Rouen, France. She was completed in 1939.

She had a Triple expansion steam engine driving a single screw propeller and one boiler. The engine was rated at 225 nhp.

Sinking 
On 24 September 1939, Phryné was on a voyage from Immingham, United Kingdom to Bayonne, France  when she hit a mine laid by the German submarine U-13 in the North Sea. There were no casualties.

References

Steamships of France
Ships sunk by German submarines in World War II
Ships built in France
Cargo ships
Shipwrecks in the North Sea
Ships sunk with no fatalities
Ships sunk by mines
Maritime incidents in September 1939